Jacob Zimmerman (September 27, 1831 – October 17, 1912) was an Illinois state legislator, newspaper editor, and businessman. Zimmerman was a pioneer in the newspaper business in Illinois and Ohio, and a businessman who invested in mining, land, and banks in the Midwest. Zimmerman held a number of elected political offices in Illinois before his death in 1912.

Early years
Zimmerman was born in Westmoreland County, Pennsylvania, on September 27, 1831. Zimmerman's father's family emigrated from Germany and his mother's family was of Welsh descent. Zimmerman's parents moved from Pennsylvania to Ohio around 1840.

Zimmerman's father, Henry Zimmerman, purchased farmland from the Wyandot Indians where the family lived in Ohio. Zimmerman was educated in the common and select schools of Upper Sandusky, Ohio.

Newspaper business
At 18, Zimmerman took up the printer's trade by working at the Wyandotte Pioneer in Upper Sandusky, Ohio. After moving from several different newspaper jobs, Zimmerman eventually ended up in Marshall, Illinois, and bought two different newspapers and consolidated them into one paper. This successful endeavor lead to many other acquisitions of newspapers in the following years.

Zimmerman also served as the editor of The Wabash Democrat. In the diaries of Edmund C. Hinde, Zimmerman was said to have gained a substantial amount of weight after he retired from the newspaper business.

Hinde Farm
From 1860 until 1903, Zimmerman lived near the Grand Rapids Dam on the Hinde family farm in Wabash County Illinois. He moved to a 160 acre farm in Friendsville, Illinois in 1903 after he gave his son Frederick the family farm as a wedding gift.

Election to Illinois House of Representatives
In 1878, Zimmerman was elected to represent his district in the 31st General Assembly of the State of Illinois and was reelected for a second term. Zimmerman was a registered Democrat. While a member of the legislature, he secured the passage of funds for the erection of a court house in Mount Carmel, Illinois. During his second term he secured the appropriation for placing the statue of Gen. James Shields in the National Statuary Hall at Washington, D.C. for which he was publicly thanked.

Later years
Zimmerman also served as county commissioner for Wabash County, Illinois and as the Highway Commissioner for the state of Illinois. After his retirement from political office, Zimmerman was active in the Illinois Farmers' Institute. He frequently gave lectures and held positions of leadership until his death.

Family life
He married his first wife Belinda Hinde on December 25, 1856. She was the daughter of Thomas S. Hinde who had founded Mount Carmel, Illinois and had been prominent in religious and political circles all his life. Both Zimmerman and Hinde had been involved with the newspaper business. Together, Jacob and Belinda had two children. Their youngest son, Frederick Hinde Zimmerman, established the Grand Rapids Hotel in Mount Carmel, Illinois.

Zimmerman married his second wife Emma Harris on April 13, 1875.

References

Further reading

External links
 City of Mount Carmel Website

1831 births
1912 deaths
Democratic Party members of the Illinois House of Representatives
County commissioners in Illinois
American people of German descent
19th-century American newspaper publishers (people)
American newspaper publishers (people)
People from Wabash County, Illinois
People from Westmoreland County, Pennsylvania
People from Upper Sandusky, Ohio
Editors of Illinois newspapers
Editors of Ohio newspapers
Farmers from Illinois
American male journalists
19th-century American politicians
Journalists from Ohio
Journalists from Pennsylvania
Journalists from Illinois